Karl Harmer (1888 – September 1966) was an Austrian football manager and former player.

Club career
He played with SK Rapid Wien on two occasions, first in 1907–08 and then on 1915–16, having won the Austrian Championship in 1915–16. He also played with FK Slavija Sarajevo, then part of Austro-Hungary as Condominium of Bosnia and Herzegovina. In 1917–18 he played back in Austrian championship with Germania Schwechat.

International career
Karl Harmer made one appearance for the Austria national football team, on November 3, 1907, in a game against Hungary.

Coaching career
During his spell in Sarajevo with Slavia, he had the role of player-coach. Later, he made use of his coaching experience there, and after retiring from active playing he coached Italian side Ternana Calcio in 1930.

Honours
Rapid Wien
Austrian Championship: 1915–16

References

1888 births
1966 deaths
Austrian footballers
Austria international footballers
Association football defenders
SK Rapid Wien players
FK Slavija Sarajevo players
Austrian football managers
FK Slavija Sarajevo managers
Ternana Calcio managers
Expatriate football managers in Italy
Austrian expatriate sportspeople in Italy